Beesley's lark (Chersomanes beesleyi) is a species of lark in the family Alaudidae. It was formerly considered to be a subspecies of the spike-heeled lark. Clements lumps this bird into the spike-heeled lark.

It is found north-eastern Tanzania. Its natural habitats are subtropical or tropical dry shrubland and subtropical or tropical seasonally wet or flooded lowland grassland.

References

Beesley's lark
Endemic birds of Tanzania
Beesley's lark
Beesley's lark